Bajki-Zalesie  is a village in the administrative district of Gmina Krypno, within Mońki County, Podlaskie Voivodeship, in north-eastern Poland.

According to the 1921 census, the village was inhabited by 420 people, among whom 410 were Roman Catholic, 5 Orthodox, and 5 Mosaic. At the same time, 419 inhabitants declared Polish nationality and 1 Belarusian. There were 73 residential buildings in the village.

References

Bajki-Zalesie